The 2007 Newfoundland and Labrador general election was held on October 9, 2007, to elect members of the 46th General Assembly of Newfoundland and Labrador.

Campaign

The election was called soon after Premier Danny Williams announced the popular Hebron Oil Field deal, and it was widely considered a foregone conclusion that Williams' Progressive Conservatives would be reelected. Polls during the campaign showed the Conservatives reaching up to 73 per cent of voter support, leading some commentators to speculate that the party could in fact win every seat in the House of Assembly — a feat accomplished only twice before in Canadian history, in Prince Edward Island in the 1935 election and in New Brunswick in the 1987 election.

On election day, the Progressive Conservatives did win ten more seats than they held at the dissolution of the previous legislature, and won just under 70 per cent of the popular vote, the highest popular vote share ever attained by a party in the province. However, they did not sweep all 48 seats in the legislature though their support was higher than the 1935 PEI election and the 1987 New Brunswick election. Three Liberal incumbents, as well as New Democratic Party leader Lorraine Michael, successfully held their seats. Notably, however, Liberal leader Gerry Reid was not reelected in his own riding.

Grand Falls-Windsor—Buchans and Bonavista South

On October 1, 2007, Gerry Tobin, Liberal candidate in the riding of Grand Falls-Windsor—Buchans, was found dead in his home. As a result, the chief electoral officer postponed the election in that riding until November 6, 2007. The Progressive Conservatives won the special election, bringing their total number of seats in the legislature to 44.

Subsequently, Clayton Hobbs, Liberal candidate in the riding of Bonavista South, dropped out of the race, citing health reasons; consequently, incumbent Progressive Conservative MHA Roger Fitzgerald was declared re-elected.

Results

Results by party

|- style="background-color:#CCCCCC"
!rowspan="2" colspan="2" style="text-align:left;" |Party
!rowspan="2" style="text-align:left;" |Party leader
!rowspan="2"|Candidates
!colspan="4" style="text-align:center;" |Seats
!colspan="3" style="text-align:center;" |Popular vote
|- style="background-color:#CCCCCC"
| style="text-align:center;" |2003
| style="text-align:center;" |Dissol.
| style="text-align:center;" |2007
| style="text-align:center;" |Change
| style="text-align:center;" |#
| style="text-align:center;" |%
| style="text-align:center;" |Change

| style="text-align:left;" |Danny Williams
| style="text-align:right;" |*48
| style="text-align:right;" |34
| style="text-align:right;" |34
| style="text-align:right;" |44
| style="text-align:right;" |+10
| style="text-align:right;" |155,943
| style="text-align:right;" |69.59%
| style="text-align:right;" |+10.88%

| style="text-align:left;" |Gerry Reid
| style="text-align:right;" |*46
| style="text-align:right;" |12
| style="text-align:right;" |11
| style="text-align:right;" |3
| style="text-align:right;" |-9
| style="text-align:right;" |48,598
| style="text-align:right;" |21.69%
| style="text-align:right;" |-11.36%

| style="text-align:left;" |Lorraine Michael
| style="text-align:right;" |36
| style="text-align:right;" |2
| style="text-align:right;" |1
| style="text-align:right;" |1
| style="text-align:right;" |-1
| style="text-align:right;" |19,028
| style="text-align:right;" |8.49%
| style="text-align:right;" |+1.63%

| colspan=2 style="text-align:left;" |Independent and no affiliation
| style="text-align:right;" |3
| style="text-align:right;" |-
| style="text-align:right;" |-
| style="text-align:right;" |-
| style="text-align:right;" |-
| style="text-align:right;" |446
| style="text-align:right;" |0.20%
| style="text-align:right;" |-%

| style="text-align:left;" |Ron Barron
| style="text-align:right;" |1
| style="text-align:right;" |*
| style="text-align:right;" |-
| style="text-align:right;" |-
| style="text-align:right;" |-
| style="text-align:right;" |68
| style="text-align:right;" |0.03%
| style="text-align:right;" |-%
|-
| 
| style="text-align:left;" colspan=4 |Vacant
| style="text-align:right;" |2
|colspan=5| 
|-
| style="text-align:left;" colspan="3" |Total
| style="text-align:right;" |132
| style="text-align:right;" |48
| style="text-align:right;" |48
| style="text-align:right;" |48
| style="text-align:right;" |-
| style="text-align:right;" |224,083
| style="text-align:right;" |100.00%
| style="text-align:right;" |
|}

Results by region

Results by riding

Bold incumbents indicates party leaders. The premier's name is boldfaced and italicized.

All candidate names are those on the official list of confirmed candidates; names in media or on party website may differ slightly.
Names in boldface type represent party leaders.
† represents that the incumbent is not running again.
§ represents that the incumbent was defeated for nomination.
₰ represents that the incumbent ran in another district and lost the nomination
‡ represents that the incumbent is running in a different district.

St. John's

|-
|bgcolor=whitesmoke|Kilbride57.35% turnout
||
|John Dinn4,44384.48%
|
|Roger Linehan3646.92%
|
|Michelle Broderick4218.01%
|
|Paul Perrier (Independent)310.59%
||
|John Dinn
|-
|bgcolor=whitesmoke|Signal Hill—Quidi Vidi71.45% turnout
|
|Maria Afonso2,13539.87%
|
|Maura Beam1582.95%
||
|Lorraine Michael3,06257.18%
|
|
||
|Lorraine Michael
|-
|bgcolor=whitesmoke|St. John's Centre57.89% turnout
||
|Shawn Skinner3,33276.49%
|
|Lori Ann Campbell-Martino3748.59%
|
|Jane Robinson65014.92%
|
|
||
|Shawn Skinner
|-
|bgcolor=whitesmoke|St. John's East65.84% turnout
||
|Ed Buckingham3,64970.09%
|
|Peter Adams69213.29%
|
|Gemma Schlamp-Hickey86416.60%
|
|
||
|John Ottenheimer†
|-
|bgcolor=whitesmoke|St. John's North56.33% turnout
||
|Bob Ridgley3,48877.55%
|
|Simon Lono56112.47%
|
|Matt Power4499.98%
|
|
||
|Bob Ridgley
|-
|bgcolor=whitesmoke|St. John's South64.88% turnout
||
|Tom Osborne3,88779.60%
|
|Rex Gibbons4258.70%
|
|Clyde Bridger57111.69%
|
|
||
|Tom Osborne
|-
|bgcolor=whitesmoke|St. John's West65.08% turnout
||
|Sheila Osborne3,62372.69%
|
|George Joyce1,01820.43%
|
|Joan Scott3446.90%
|
|
||
|Sheila Osborne
|-
|bgcolor=whitesmoke|Virginia Waters56.12% turnout
||
|Kathy Dunderdale4,04373.04%
|
|Drew Brown4297.75%
|
|Dave Sullivan71012.83%
|
|Fred Wilcox (Independent)3536.38%
||
|Kathy Dunderdale
|}

St. John's suburbs

|-
|bgcolor=whitesmoke|Cape St. Francis71.01% turnout
||
|Jack Byrne4,98377.45%
|
|Bill Tapper73911.49%
|
|Kathleen Connors68010.57%
||
|Jack Byrne
|-
|bgcolor=whitesmoke|Conception Bay East—Bell Island59.70% turnout
||
|Dianne Whalen3,99171.55% 
|
|Linda Goodyear99917.91%
|
|Gavin Will56910.20%
||
|Dianne Whalen
|-
|bgcolor=whitesmoke|Conception Bay South61.97% turnout
||
|Terry French4,67079.10%
|
|Jerry Young95310.03%
|
|Touria Tougui2594.64%
||
|Terry French
|-
|bgcolor=whitesmoke|Mount Pearl North61.36% turnout
||
|Steve Kent4,75184.72%
|
|Elaine Reid5059.00%
|
|Janice Lockyer3305.88%
||
|Harvey Hodder†
|-
|bgcolor=whitesmoke|Mount Pearl South61.11% turnout
||
|Dave Denine4,16384.12%
|
|William Reid4418.91%
|
|Tom McGinnis3326.71%
||
|Dave Denine
|-
|bgcolor=whitesmoke|Topsail59.49% turnout
||
|Elizabeth Marshall4,89282.85%
|
|Cynthia Barron-Layden5138.69%
|
|Kyle Rees4868.23%
||
|Elizabeth Marshall
|}

Avalon and Burin Peninsulas

|-
|bgcolor=whitesmoke|Bellevue68.11% turnout
||
|Calvin Peach2,90855.82%
|
|Denise Pike2,13941.06%
|
|Ian Slade1552.98%
||
|Percy Barrett †
|-
|bgcolor=whitesmoke|Burin—Placentia West69.35% turnout
||
|Clyde Jackman3,14159.09%
|
|George Brake4578.60%
|
|Julie Mitchell1,70432.05%
||
|Clyde Jackman
|-
|bgcolor=whitesmoke|Carbonear—Harbour Grace67.40% turnout
||
|Jerome Kennedy4,36774.14%
|
|Paul Baldwin1,46324.84%
|
|
||
|George Sweeney †
|-
|bgcolor=whitesmoke|Ferryland60.51% turnout
||
|Keith Hutchings4,25683.40%
|
|Kevin Bennett4729.25%
|
|Grace Bavington3516.88%
||
|Keith Hutchings
|-
|bgcolor=whitesmoke|Grand Bank63.37% turnout
||
|Darin King3,56379.69%
|
|Rod Cake88919.88%
|
|
||
|Judy Foote†
|-
|bgcolor=whitesmoke|Harbour Main62.51% turnout
||
|Tom Hedderson4,58682.25%
|
|Kevin Slaney63511.39%
|
|Jean Dandenault3235.79%
||
|Tom Hedderson
|-
|bgcolor=whitesmoke|Placentia—St. Mary's51.58% turnout
||
|Felix Collins3,08678.24%
|
|
|
|Jennifer Coultas81220.64%
||
|Felix Collins
|-
|bgcolor=whitesmoke|Port de Grave76.44% turnout
|
|Glenn Littlejohn3,06946.62%
||
|Roland Butler3,32950.57%
|
|Randy Dawe1622.46%
||
|Roland Butler
|-
|bgcolor=whitesmoke|Trinity—Bay de Verde71.61% turnout
||
|Charlene Johnson3,57271.65%
|
|Bruce Layman1,13722.81%
|
|Don Penney2575.16%
||
|Charlene Johnson
|}

Central Newfoundland

|-
|bgcolor=whitesmoke|Baie Verte—Springdale55.78% turnout
||
|Tom Rideout3,38875.14%
|
|Glendon Bungay79817.70%
|
|Tim Howse3016.68%
|
|
||
|Vacant
|-
|bgcolor=whitesmoke|Bonavista North59.20% turnout
||
|Harry Harding2,88367.09%
|
|Winston Carter1,29230.07%
|
|Howard Parsons801.86%
|
|
||
|Harry Harding
|-
|bgcolor=whitesmoke|Bonavista South
||
|Roger Fitzgeraldwon by acclamation
|
|
|
|
|
|
||
|Roger Fitzgerald
|-
|bgcolor=whitesmoke|Exploits63.13% turnout
||
|Clayton Forsey3,39672.16%
|
|Jody Fancey1,29527.52%
|
|
|
|
||
|Clayton Forsey
|-
|bgcolor=whitesmoke|Gander55.91% turnout
||
|Kevin O'Brien3,59974.36%
|
|Stephanie Winsor1,19324.65%
|
|
|
|
||
|Kevin O'Brien
|-
|bgcolor=whitesmoke|Grand Falls-Windsor—Buchans52.60% turnout
||
|Susan Sullivan2,76771.63%
|
|John J. Woodrow1634.22%
| 
|Junior C. Downey92223.87%
|
|
||
|Anna Thistle†
|-
|bgcolor=whitesmoke|Grand Falls-Windsor—Green Bay South53.73% turnout
||
|Ray Hunter2,53568.68%
|
|Aubrey Smith95725.93%
|
|John Whelan1885.09%
|
|
||
|Ray Hunter
|-
|bgcolor=whitesmoke|Lewisporte48.49% turnout
||
|Wade Verge2,66070.43%
|
|John Martin64717.13%
|
|Garry Vatcher46012.18%
|
|
||
|Tom Rideout
|-
|bgcolor=whitesmoke|Terra Nova55.71% turnout
||
|Paul Oram3,42773.84%
|
|Katty Gallant78116.83%
|
|Bill Cashin3587.71%
|
|Lionel Glover (Independent)621.34%
||
|Paul Oram
|-
|bgcolor=whitesmoke|The Isles of Notre Dame66.78% turnout
||
|Derrick Dalley2,37149.88%
|
|Gerry Reid2,36449.74%
|
|
|
|
||
|Gerry Reid
|-
|bgcolor=whitesmoke|Trinity North57.21% turnout
||
|Ross Wiseman3,93981.77%
|
|Kathryn Small60912.64%
|
|Janet Stringer2475.13%
|
|
||
|Ross Wiseman
|}

Western and Southern Newfoundland

|-
|bgcolor=whitesmoke|Bay of Islands73.45% turnout
||
|Terry Loder2,81751.56%
|
|Eddie Joyce2,52046.12%
|
|Charlie Murphy1071.96%
||
|Eddie Joyce
|-
|bgcolor=whitesmoke|Burgeo—La Poile62.46% turnout
|
|Colin Short1,86438.45%
||
|Kelvin Parsons2,88259.45%
|
|June Hiscock851.75%
||
|Kelvin Parsons
|-
|bgcolor=whitesmoke|Fortune Bay—Cape La Hune65.00% turnout
||
|Tracey Perry2,53962.86%
|
|Elvis Loveless1,39434.51%
|
|Sheldon Hynes842.08%
||
|Oliver Langdon†
|-
|bgcolor=whitesmoke|Humber East64.97% turnout
||
|Tom Marshall4,16083.48%
|
|Michael Hoffe53710.78%
|
|Jean Graham2565.14%
||
|Tom Marshall
|-
|bgcolor=whitesmoke|Humber Valley74.29% turnout
||
|Darryl Kelly3,02351.29%
|
|Dwight Ball2,76946.98%
|
|Kris Hynes871.48%
||
|Dwight Ball
|-
|bgcolor=whitesmoke|Humber West59.89% turnout
||
|Danny Williams3,75587.39%
|
|Maurice Budgell51612.01%
|
|
||
|'''Danny Williams
|-
|bgcolor=whitesmoke|Port au Port61.10% turnout
||
|Tony Cornect3,93680.80%
|
|Michelle Felix-Morgan91018.68%
|
|
||
|Tony Cornect
|-
|bgcolor=whitesmoke|St. Barbe58.04% turnout
||
|Wallace Young2,49158.47%
|
|Jim Bennett1,56036.62%
|
|Gary Noel1964.60%
||
|Wallace Young
|-
|bgcolor=whitesmoke|St. George's—Stephenville East58.86% turnout
||
|Joan Burke3,14374.36%
|
|George Lee1,06225.12%
|
|
||
|Joan Burke
|-
|bgcolor=whitesmoke|The Straits - White Bay North66.78% turnout
||
|Trevor Taylor2,65162.66%
|
|Boyd Noel1,35832.10%
|
|Gerry Ryall1714.04%
||
|Trevor Taylor
|}

Labrador

|-
|bgcolor=whitesmoke|Cartwright—L'Anse au Clair74.28% turnout
|
|Dennis Normore64626.92%
||
|Yvonne Jones1,73672.33%
|
|
|
|
||
|Yvonne Jones
|-
|bgcolor=whitesmoke|Labrador West68.36% turnout
||
|Jim Baker2,20450.69%
|
|Karen Oldford2876.60%
|
|Darrel Brenton1,84842.50%
|
|
||
|Jim Baker
|-
|bgcolor=whitesmoke|Lake Melville70.28% turnout
||
|John Hickey2,38056.29%
|
|Chris Montague1,67239.55%
|
|Bill Cooper1473.48%
|
|
||
|John Hickey
|-
|bgcolor=whitesmoke|Torngat Mountains71.19% turnout
||
|Patty Pottle79453.65%
|
|Danny Dumaresque60440.81%
|
|
|
|Jim Tuttauk1097.36%
||
|Vacant
|}

Election Results by Party and Seats

See also 
46th General Assembly of Newfoundland and Labrador
Speaker of the House of Assembly of Newfoundland and Labrador
List of Newfoundland and Labrador General Assemblies
List of Newfoundland and Labrador political parties

General resources
Government of Newfoundland and Labrador
Elections Newfoundland and Labrador

Election coverage
Election Almanac - Newfoundland and Labrador Provincial Election
Professor Antweiler's Voter Migration Election Forecaster  - Newfoundland and Labrador Provincial Election 2007

Parties
Progressive Conservative Party of Newfoundland and Labrador  (see also Conservative Party of Canada)
Liberal Party of Newfoundland and Labrador (see also Liberal Party of Canada)
Newfoundland and Labrador New Democratic Party (see also New Democratic Party)

Notes

External links

References

Further reading
 

Elections in Newfoundland and Labrador
2007 elections in Canada
2007 in Newfoundland and Labrador
October 2007 events in Canada